Alu language may refer to:

Alu language (Papuan), or Dia, a language of Papua New Guinea
Alu language (Austronesian), or Mono, a language of the Solomon Islands
Alu language (Sino-Tibetan), a language of China
Alu Kurumba language, a language of India